The Hans Christian Andersen Literature Award is a Danish literary award established in 2010. It is awarded every other year to a living author whose work resembles Hans Christian Andersen. It is one of the biggest literary prizes in the world with the winner receiving  (£60,000, or approximately $90,000). The winner receives a bronze sculpture "The Ugly Duckling" by sculptor Stine Ring Hansen.

Paulo Coelho is listed for 2007 even though the award was not established until 2010. This is because in 2007 Coelho was presented with an honorary award by the city of Odense that was so well received the organizers of the ceremony decided to make it an annual affair and thus the idea for the Hans Christian Andersen Literature Award was born, the first official award given in 2010 but Coelho's honorary award is also listed by the award organizers.

Winners 
 2007: Paulo Coelho (Honorarium – see note above)
 2010: J. K. Rowling
 2012: Isabel Allende
 2014: Salman Rushdie
 2016: Haruki Murakami
 2018: A. S. Byatt
 2020: Karl Ove Knausgård

Notes

External links 

 

Awards established in 2010
Danish literary awards
Fiction awards
Hans Christian Andersen
Children's literary awards
Literary awards honoring writers